There have been five baronetcies created for persons with the surname Wentworth, four in the Baronetage of England and one in the Baronetage of Great Britain. All creations are extinct.

The Wentworth Baronetcy, of Wentworth Woodhouse in the County of York, was created in the Baronetage of England on 1611. For more information on this creation, see Earl of Strafford.

The Wentworth Baronetcy, of Gosfield in the County of Essex, was created in the Baronetage of England on 29 June 1611 for John Wentworth. The title became extinct on his death in 1631.

The Wentworth Baronetcy, of West Bretton in the County of York, was created in the Baronetage of England on 27 September 1664 for Thomas Wentworth. The fourth Baronet sat as Member of Parliament for Malton. The title became extinct on the death of the fifth Baronet in 1792.

The Wentworth Baronetcy, of North Elmsal in the County of York, was created in the Baronetage of England on 28 July 1692 for John Wentworth. The title became extinct on the death of the second Baronet in 1741.

The Wentworth Baronetcy, of Parlut in the County of Lincoln, was created in the Baronetage of Great Britain on 16 May 1795 for John Wentworth. The title became extinct on the death of the second Baronet in 1844.

Wentworth baronets, of Wentworth Woodhouse (1611)
see Earl of Strafford

Wentworth baronets, of Gosfield (1611)

Sir John Wentworth, 1st Baronet, of Gosfield (–1631)

Wentworth baronets, of West Bretton (1664)

Sir Thomas Wentworth, 1st Baronet (c. 1615–1675)
Sir Matthew Wentworth, 2nd Baronet (died 1678), brother
Sir Matthew Wentworth, 3rd Baronet (c. 1665–1706)
Sir William Wentworth, 4th Baronet (1686–1763)
Sir Thomas Wentworth Blackett, 5th Baronet (1726–1792)

Wentworth baronets, of North Elmsal (1692)
Sir John Wentworth, 1st Baronet (1673–1720)
Sir Butler Cavendish Wentworth, 2nd Baronet (c. 1710–1741)

Wentworth baronets, of Parlut (1795)

Sir John Wentworth, 1st Baronet (1737–1820)
Sir Charles Mary Wentworth, 2nd Baronet (1775–1844)

References

 

Extinct baronetcies in the Baronetage of England
Extinct baronetcies in the Baronetage of Great Britain
1611 establishments in England